Bothell Pioneer Cemetery is a cemetery located in Bothell, Washington.

Description and history
The cemetery lies on both the northeast and southeast corners of the junction of 180th Avenue NE and NE 180th Street. The initial  of land for the cemetery was provided by George Rutter Wilson for the burial of his children. He transferred ownership to the local Odd Fellows lodge in 1902. The city took over the cemetery in 1990. It was listed on the National Register of Historic Places on February 16, 1996.

See also
 National Register of Historic Places listings in King County, Washington

References

External links
 
 

 

1880s establishments in Washington (state)
1889 establishments in Washington (state)
Cemeteries in Washington (state)
Cemeteries on the National Register of Historic Places in Washington (state)
Geography of Bothell, Washington
National Register of Historic Places in King County, Washington